Pabbo, sometimes spelled as Pabo, is a municipality in Amuru District of the Northern Region of Uganda.

Location
Pabbo is on the Gulu-Nimule Road, the main highway (A-104) between Gulu and the border with Southern Sudan at Nimule. The coordinates of the town are 03 00 00N, 32 08 42E (Latitude:3.0000; Longitude:32.1450).

Overview
During the Lord's Resistance Army war (1986 - 2006), Pabbo was the site of one of the largest camps for internally displaced people, swelling to over 67,000 in 2005. Since the cessation of hostilities in 2006, some of those people have returned to their villages.

Points of interest
The following points of interest lie within the town limits or close to its edges:

 offices of Pabbo Town Council
 Pabbo central market
 Gulu-Nimule Road, passing through town in a north/south direction.

See also
Acholi people
Acholi sub-region
List of roads in Uganda
List of cities and towns in Uganda

References

External links
Revisiting A Bloody 20-Year War Through Monuments, Key Sites

Amuru District
Populated places in Northern Region, Uganda
Cities in the Great Rift Valley